= Volga Ulyanovsk =

Volga Ulyanovsk may refer to

- Volga Ulyanovsk Bandy Club
- FC Volga Ulyanovsk, association football club
